Aziz Nacib Ab'Sáber (October 24, 1924 – March 16, 2012) was a geographer and one of Brazil's most respected scientists, honored with the highest awards of Brazilian science in geography, geology, ecology and archaeology. Graduated in geography, he was a president and honorary president of the Sociedade Brasileira para o Progresso da Ciência (Brazilian Society for the Advancement of Science), Emeritus Professor of the University of São Paulo and member of the highest rank - Order Grão-Cruz in Earth Sciences - of the Academy of Science. Among the awards, he has received the UNESCO Prize on Science and the Environment in 2001 and the Prize to the Intellectual of Brazil in 2011.

The contributions of Ab'Saber to science range from the first research of oil camps in Brazil's northeast to surveys of Brazil's natural realms and the restoration of the history of forests, camps and primitive humans over geologic time in South America. He made central contributions to biology, South American archaeology, and to Brazilian ecology, geology and geography. He has published more than 480 works, most of them scientific publications. Among his scientific proposals are FLORAM, the Code of biodiversity and his theory of refuges related to the Amazones.

Ab'Sáber was the first person to classify scientifically the Brazilian and South-America territory in morphoclimatic domains. He also contributed to the "Pleistocene refuge hypothesis", an attempt to explain the distribution of Neotropical taxa as a function of their isolation in forest fragments during glacial periods, which allowed populations to speciate. He died in 2012 following a heart attack.

Selected publications 
 Ab'Saber, A.N. 2010, BECA,2010; 558 pp
 Ab'Sáber, A. N. 1982. The paleoclimate and paleoecology of Brazilian Amazonia. In Biological Diversification in the Tropics. New York:Columbia University Press. p. 41-59.
 Ab'Sáber, A. N. 1983. . vol. 40, p. 41-55.
 Ab'Sáber, A. N. 1986. . São Paulo:CNPq. p. 88-123.
 Ab'Sáber, A. N. 1989. . vol. 5, p. 4-20.
 Ab'Sáber, A. N. 1990. . vol. 5, p. 19-62.
 Ab'Sáber, A. N. 1990. . vol. 4, p. 149-174.
 Ab`Saber, A. N. Ecossistemas do Brasil. Metalivros, 2006.

References

Further reading
"Aziz Nacib Ab'Saber" page at the Brazilian Academy of Science website

External links
 Ab'Saber's interview on Brazil and the world situation, 1/2, 2010
 Ab'Saber's interview on Brazil and the world situation, 2/2

1924 births
2012 deaths
People from São Luiz do Paraitinga
People from São Paulo (state)
Brazilian people of Arab descent
Brazilian geographers
20th-century Brazilian geologists
Recipients of the Great Cross of the National Order of Scientific Merit (Brazil)
Academic staff of the University of São Paulo
University of São Paulo alumni